Draginje is a village in Serbia. It is situated in the Koceljeva municipality, in the Mačva District of Central Serbia. In 2002 the village had a Serb ethnic majority and a population of 1,701, this included 319 people from the Romani minority.  The football club FK Draginje hails from Draginje.

Historical population

1948: 1,915
1953: 2,061
1961: 2,110
1971: 2,006
1981: 1,888
1991: 1,819
2002: 1,701

See also
List of places in Serbia

References

External links

Populated places in Mačva District
Romani communities in Serbia